Daniel Brata (born 29 December 1984) is a Romanian judoka.

Achievements

External links
 
 

1984 births
Living people
Romanian male judoka
Olympic judoka of Romania
Judoka at the 2008 Summer Olympics
Judoka at the 2012 Summer Olympics
20th-century Romanian people
21st-century Romanian people